Athea ( or Áth Té) is a village in west County Limerick, Ireland. Athea has a Roman Catholic church, and is the centre for the parish of Athea, which encompasses several nearby townlands.

History
The community was dependent on agriculture and a creamery was built near the river which acted as the centrepoint for local trade. A primary school was built near the creamery to cope with the rising younger population. Over time, cottages and workshops lined the main road to create the village of Athea. New local roads were built to neighbouring Moyvane and off the main Listowel-Limerick and Glin-Abbeyfeale roads. The river was the primary water source as well as its use for drainage.

The Catholic population were forbidden to practise their faith under Penal Laws, and the first church wasn't built in Athea until the early 19th century. Prior to this locals congregated each Sunday at a Mass rock to the east of the village.

Geography

Topography
Athea is situated on the river Galey and the crossroads of the R523 (Reens - Listowel) and R524 (Glin - Abbeyfeale) regional roads. It is a 3 km east of the Limerick/Kerry border in the hills of west Limerick. Its highest point is in the Parkanna townland where, at 220 m above sea level, surrounding towns and counties can be seen.

The river Galey is a tributary to the larger River Feale. The name is derived from the Irish language "Abhainn na Gáile", River of the Gaille, a tribe who lived along its banks. There are two bridges across the river; the R523/R524 intersection bridge just east of the village and Barry's Bridge, 2 km northwest of the village. Athea has suffered damage and disruption over several years, when the River Galley flooded in 2005, 2008, 2009 and 2015. Proposals and funding to address the issue had been muted for several years, and a civil engineering consultancy were appointed by Limerick County Council in October 2019 to "assess, develop and design" a flood relief scheme.

Townlands
The large parish of Athea is divided into 25 townlands:
 Athea Lower [Áth an tSléibhe Íochtair - the fort of the mountain]
 Athea Upper [Áth an tSléibhe Uachtar - the fort of the mountain]
 Clash North [An Chlais - the trench]
 Clash South [An Chlais - the trench]
 Coole East [An Chúil - the corner]
 Coole West [An Chúil - the corner]
 Cratloe East [An Chreatalach - a sallow wood]
 Cratloe West [An Chreatalach - a sallow wood]
 Direen Lower [An Doirín - the small thicket]
 Direen Upper [An Doirín - the small thicket]
 Dromada [Drom Fhada - long ridge]
 Glashapullagh [Glaise an Phollaigh - the stream of the place of holes]
 Glenagore [Gleann an Ghabhair - the glen of the goat]
 Gortnagross [Gort na gCros - the field of the crosses]
 Keale North [An Caol - the narrow feature]
 Keale South [An Caol - the narrow feature]
 Knockdown [Cnoc Donn - brown hill]
 Knockfinisk [Cnoc Finnisce - hill of bright water]
 Knocknagorna [Cnoc na gCoirneach - the hill of the clerics]
 Parkanna [An Pháirc - the field]
 Rooskagh [Rúscach - marshy place]
 Templeathea East [Teampaill an tSléibhe - The church of the mountain]
 Templeathea West [Teampaill an tSléibhe - The church of the mountain]
 Tooradoo [Na Tuara Dubha - the black animal enclosures]
 Tooreendonnell [Tuairín Dónaill - the small animal enclosure of Dónall]

Electoral division
Athea is situated in the constituency of Limerick West; the parish itself is subdivided into two electoral areas - the Newcastlewest electoral area (predominantly south of the river Galey) and the Rathkeale electoral area (north of the river) which are used mainly in local elections. At European level, Athea is in the constituency of Ireland South. At election times, the school is used as the polling station.

Built heritage
Colbert Street and Dalton Street are the main streets in the village. St. Bartholomew's Church is located on Colbert Street and the village has two graveyards, Holy Cross on the outskirts of the village and The "Old Graveyard" in Templeathea just over a mile away.

Con Colbert Memorial Hall
Opened in January 1974 by Erskine Hamilton Childers, Con Colbert Memorial Hall is named after one of the executed leaders of the 1916 Easter Rising. The hall is used for meetings, sports events and other gatherings. Since its opening, it has been extended to incorporate a sports complex. The cost of this renovation neared €1 million and despite charity donations, government grants and other fundraising efforts, the community hall committee is still faced with a large (if decreasing) debt.

John Paul II Footbridge
Athea's only pedestrian bridge was opened by Donal Murray, Bishop of Limerick, in 2005. The bridge is located next to the existing road bridge at the eastern end of the main street. It had been proposed for years for the local school pupils who were crossing the busy road bridge and was seen as a health and safety hazard sharing the bridge with cars. The bridge is 2m wide and 11m long. It was commissioned by Athea Community Council Ltd. who raised €260,000. The debt was reduced to €27,000 by the "Lucky Numbers" drawings, held Saturday nights.

St. Bartholomew's Church
St. Bartholomew's Roman Catholic Church is located on the main street and was built in 1832. It underwent renovations in 1862 and 1980s. The church spire can be seen from all approach roads to the village.

Monuments
The Goold Monument, located in Upper Athea commemorates James Goold, a landlord who, at the time of the Great Famine refused to evict tenants who couldn't pay rent. Dated to 1863, the monument comprises a 4 m high Celtic cross which stands just off the road to Listowel.

The Olympic Statue, colloquially called "the feet" is a monument in The Square commemorating two Irish olympic medalists who were originally from Athea - Tim Ahearne and Dan Ahearne. Tim Ahearne won gold in the triple jump in the 1908 Olympics, while his younger brother Dan Ahearne is known for setting a world record in 1909. The sculpture depicts two golden feet with wings spread out.

Culture

Events
Annually large events such as the Vintage Rally, TradFéile and Athea Motorcycle Road Races are held during summer months. The latter, the Athea Motorcycle Road Races, is a two-day event taking place on a Saturday and Sunday at the end of June. In 2007 the race attracted an estimated 18,000 visitors to the village according to Gardaí. Names such as Martin Finnegan and William Dunlop have taken part in the event in the past. A fun fair is usually brought to the village the week before the festival.

Parklands
The "Giant's Garden" is a walk from the Memorial Hall to Holy Cross Cemetery in Templeathea. It is named after a legend that incorporates a giant carrying his deceased mother on his shoulders to be buried. The Giant's Garden overlooks Athea Village as well as the hills and river southwest of the village.

Media
The Athea & District News newsletter is published by local print company Cáirde Dúchais on a weekly basis. It features local columnists and current affairs. It also contains articles for the neighbouring towns and villages of Knockdown, Carrigkerry and Abbeyfeale.

The Weekly Observer newspaper which contains articles for towns over much of west Limerick has an "Athea Notes" column resulting in it being a household newspaper in Athea.

Sport

Athea GAA (Áth an tSléibhe CLG) is the local Gaelic Athletic Association club, and its team colours are maroon and white. The club is located in Templeathea, 1 km east of the village on the R523. Athea Credit Union are the primary sponsors of the club.

Athea United Athletic Football Club is a local soccer club. It moved to a new site in 2000, and its clubhouse is located in Lower Dirreen on the Glin Road (R524).

The Athea Blazers Basketball Club was formed in 2005 and has its base is at Con Colbert Memorial Hall. Fishing also takes place in the area.

Demographics
In the 2016 census, the population of the village was 369. Approximately 90% of the population were born in Ireland, with other residents born in the UK, Poland, and elsewhere in the world.

91% of census respondents in Athea listed their religion as Roman Catholic, 7% other stated religions and approximately 2% no stated religion or no religion.

Education
The primary school - Athea National School (Athea NS) - was built in 1921. Prior to this, a small thatched schoolhouse was located centrally in the village (now no longer in use). Athea NS is located in Templeathea townland, just east of the village centre. When opened in 1921, it had a capacity of 100 students. A large extension to the school was officially opened in 2009. Today's building houses five classrooms with toilet facilities in each room, a principal's office, a secretary's office, a library, a computer room and a preschool. The school is headed by the Athea National School Board of Management.

Although there are no post-primary schools in Athea, bus transport is available to secondary schools in nearby Abbeyfeale (St. Ita's, St. Joseph's and Abbeyfeale Vocational School) and Tarbert (Tarbert Comprehensive).

Transport
A Limerick-Tralee bus service operates via Athea every Wednesday. There are also local hackney services available. The closest train stations to Athea are the Colbert Station in Limerick city and Charleville in County Cork.

Notable people
 Con Colbert, the youngest man to be executed by the British after the Easter Rising in 1916, lived on the family farm in Athea.
 Kevin Danaher, folklorist and historian, was born in Athea. His early education was at Athea National School and Mungret College, County Limerick. In 1934, Danaher became a part-time collector for the Irish Folklore Commission.
 Tim Ahearne and Dan Ahearn were brothers who competed in the 1908 and 1920 Olympics respectively.
 Con Greaney, traditional Irish singer, is from Athea.
 Lisa Murtagh, whose mother is an Athea native, was crowned 48th Rose of Tralee. She represented New York, but acknowledged Athea as her "second home" in her speech at the pageant in 2008.

See also
 List of towns and villages in Ireland

References

Towns and villages in County Limerick